Cravant may refer to:

 Cravant, Loiret, France
 Cravant, Yonne, France
 Battle of Cravant (1423)
 Cravant-les-Côteaux, Indre-et-Loire, France